Arthur Bridgman Clark (1866–1948) an American architect, printmaker, author, and professor, as well as the first mayor of Mayfield, California (1855–1925), and first head of Art and Architecture Department at Stanford University. He taught classes at Stanford University from 1893 until 1931.

About 
Clark was born August 11, 1866 in Syracuse, New York. 

He studied at Syracuse University and earned a Bachelor of Architecture degree in 1886, and a Master of Arts degree in 1891. The same year, in 1891 he married Hanna Grace Birge of Hector, New York. From 1888–1889, he was the Director of State Schools and an instructor of trade school at Elmira Reformatory. He taught Architecture courses at Syracuse University between 1889–c.1892.

Clark and his wife studied painting with William Merritt Chase in Art Students League of New York in 1898 and with John Henry Twachtman and James Whistler in Paris. 

Clark moved to California in 1892, settling in the College Terrace neighborhood of Palo Alto. He joined Stanford University 1893, during the early days of the school. He taught graphic design and art classes at Stanford University from 1893 until 1931, when he retired. Students of Clark included artist Jennie V. Cannon. 

During the summers when Stanford University classes were out of session, Clark would work as a freelance architect in the Palo Alto-area designing private residencies. 

In 1903, Clark spearheaded a movement to incorporate the town of Mayfield and was named the town's first mayor. Mayfield was a town that bordered Stanford University and at the time was a popular destination for rowdy bars. While serving as Mayor Clark banned bars from the town, which allowed the town to flourish and grow. He later served as the chairman of the Planning Commission. The town of Mayfield became part of Palo Alto on July 6, 1925.

Clark was a founder and a member of the Pacific Arts Association, and a member of the American Committee for the International Congress of Art Education, the Palo Alto Art Club (now known as Pacific Art League), and California Teachers Association.

Clark died May 15, 1948 in Palo Alto, California and he is buried at Alta Mesa Memorial Park.

Notable buildings by Arthur Bridgman Clark

Publications

See also 

 National Register of Historic Places listings in Santa Clara County, California

References

External links 
 Arthur Bridgman Clark Papers from Online Archive of California (OAC)
 

1866 births
1948 deaths
Stanford University Department of Art and Art History faculty
Syracuse University School of Architecture alumni
Architects from California
People from Palo Alto, California
20th-century American printmakers
Writers from Syracuse, New York
Art Students League of New York alumni